Ramaric Etou (born 25 January 1995) is a Congolese footballer who plays for Dila Gori and Congo national football team.

References

1995 births
Living people
AC Léopards players
Beitar Tel Aviv Bat Yam F.C. players
Sektzia Ness Ziona F.C. players
FC Dila Gori players
Erovnuli Liga players
Republic of the Congo footballers
Association football defenders
Republic of the Congo international footballers
Republic of the Congo expatriate footballers
Expatriate footballers in Israel
Expatriate footballers in Georgia (country)
Republic of the Congo expatriate sportspeople in Israel
Republic of the Congo expatriate sportspeople in Georgia (country)
Republic of the Congo youth international footballers